Rigiolepis is a genus of flowering plants belonging to the family Ericaceae.

Its native range is Malesia.

Species:
 Rigiolepis adenopoda (Sleumer) Argent 
 Rigiolepis andersonii (Sleumer) Argent

References

Ericaceae
Ericaceae genera